Potong Gate is the western gate of the inner system of the walled city of Pyongyang (Pyongyang Castle).  It was originally built in the sixth century   as an official Koguryo construction, and was later rebuilt in 1473. It features a granite base topped by a two-story structure. The gate's structure was destroyed by American air attacks during the destruction of Pyongyang in Korean War, but was later reconstructed in 1955.

It is listed as National Treasures #3 in Asia.

See also
 Pyongyang Castle
 Taedongmun
 National Treasures of North Korea

References

External links

 http://www.vnctravel.nl/northkorea/?City_Guide:Pyongyang:Pothong_River

Buildings and structures in Pyongyang
National Treasures of North Korea
Goguryeo
Gates in North Korea
Gates in Korea